Marag may refer to 

 Black pudding - A sausage made by cooking blood
 Hyderabadi Marag - A mutton soup